Pierre Calori is a French slalom canoeist who competed from the late 1970s to the late 1980s. He won seven medals at the ICF Canoe Slalom World Championships with two golds (C-2: 1987; C-2 team: 1987) and five silvers (C-2: 1979, 1983, 1985; C-2 team: 1979, 1985).

References

French male canoeists
Living people
Year of birth missing (living people)
Medalists at the ICF Canoe Slalom World Championships